Brian Hamm is a baseball coach and former shortstop, who is the current head baseball coach of the Yale Bulldogs. He played college soccer and college baseball at Middlebury College from 1998 to 2002. He then served as the head baseball coach of the Amherst Mammoths (2010–2018) and the Eastern Connecticut State Warriors (2019–2022). He lead the Warriors to a NCAA Division III National Championship in 2022.

Head coaching record

References

External links
Yale Bulldogs bio

Year of birth missing (living people)
Living people
Amherst Mammoths baseball coaches
Eastern Connecticut State Warriors baseball coaches
Middlebury Panthers baseball coaches
Middlebury Panthers baseball players
Middlebury Panthers men's soccer players
Yale Bulldogs baseball coaches